This list of screenwriting awards for film is an index to articles on notable awards given for film screenwriting. The list is organized by region and country of the awards venue or sponsor, but winners are not necessarily restricted to people from that country.

Americas

Asia

Europe

Oceania

See also

 Screenwriting
 Lists of awards
 List of film awards
 List of writing awards

References

 
Screenwriting for film